Old College Historic District is a national historic district located at Newark in New Castle County, Delaware.  It consists of six contributing buildings: Old College, Recitation Hall, Recitation Annex, Alumni Hall, Mechanical Hall, and Elliott House.  These buildings formed the nucleus, and until the 20th century, the entire campus of Delaware College.

It was added to the National Register of Historic Places in 1973.

References

External links

Historic districts on the National Register of Historic Places in Delaware
Newark, Delaware
University of Delaware
Historic districts in New Castle County, Delaware
Historic American Buildings Survey in Delaware
National Register of Historic Places in New Castle County, Delaware